Feral boar may refer to:

 A male feral pig of the domesticated subspecies Sus scrofa domesticus. (Females are feral sows.)
 A misnomer ("feral") for a wild boar (a.k.a. "wild pig", Sus scrofa) of either gender (although females are more properly wild sows)

Animal common name disambiguation pages